Gary Anthony Williams (born March 14, 1966) is an American actor, comedian and filmmaker. He has voiced the characters of Uncle Ruckus on The Boondocks, General Horace Warfield in StarCraft II: Wings of Liberty and Dr. Richard Tygan in XCOM 2. He has also appeared on shows such as Boston Legal, I'm Sorry, Malcolm in the Middle and The Soul Man. He was a cast member on the sketch comedy series Blue Collar TV and currently the improv comedy series Whose Line Is It Anyway?. He is also a co-founder of the L.A. Comedy Shorts Film Festival.

Early life and career
Born in Fayetteville, Georgia, Williams was involved in theater, comedy and television in Atlanta, where his credits include acting with the Georgia Shakespeare Festival, performing and writing for Agatha's: A Taste of Mystery and being a longtime member of Atlanta's longest running improv troupe, Laughing Matters. Williams had recurring roles in the television series I'll Fly Away and In the Heat of the Night, both filmed in the Atlanta area. He moved to Los Angeles in 1998.

Television
Williams' past roles include Abe Kenarban (Stevie's dad) in the Fox TV sitcom Malcolm in the Middle and as Judge Trudy's Bailiff on Nickelodeon's The Amanda Show. Williams was a series regular on the WB Television Network sketch comedy series, Blue Collar TV.

In 2003, Williams had a small role in an episode of CSI: Crime Scene Investigation, "Invisible Evidence." During season three and four of Boston Legal, Williams appeared as part-time lawyer Clarence Bell, a pathologically shy man who expresses himself through characters, including crossdressing as women (including a nun and celebrities such as Oprah Winfrey). The role of Clarence/Clarice was originally to appear in one episode, but was expanded into a recurring role and then a regular role.

Williams plays parts in five different shows on Cartoon Network's late night programming block, Adult Swim, one being a STRATA technician on Saul of the Molemen, another as the self-hating African American, Uncle Ruckus on The Boondocks, Coroner Rick, a recurring character on Stroker and Hoop, he also played the role of Paul Revere on the television special, The Young Person's Guide to History, and served as the voice-over announcer for The Eric Andre Show until 2013. He also voiced Riff Tamson in the opening three episodes of season four of Star Wars: The Clone Wars. He is also the voice of Mr. Dos on Special Agent Oso. He appeared on an episode of Hot in Cleveland as a drama teacher and soccer coach.

In 2009 and 2010, Williams provided the voice of the supervillain Mongul for several episodes of the animated series, Batman: The Brave and the Bold. On one occasion, he voiced the character's sister, Mongal. He also voiced the supervillain Thunderball in The Avengers: Earth's Mightiest Heroes.

Williams is currently working on a new Mike Judge animated series. He was part of a segment in the show Beyond Belief: Fact or Fiction, and guest-starred on How I Met Your Mother and Two and a Half Men. Williams also guest stars as the halfway house director in the 7th season of the TV show Weeds. In 2011, he joined the cast of the animated series China, IL as the voice of Doctor Falgot. Williams was also in an episode of the show Workaholics. He was a series regular for the animated sketch comedy series Mad and is currently voicing Mr. McStuffins for the animated Disney Junior series, Doc McStuffins and Dirty Dan and Dusty for the animated Disney Junior series Sheriff Callie's Wild West. He is also the narrator for the TV One series UNSUNG. From 2012 to 2016, Williams appeared as the recurring character Lester on the TV Land original sitcom The Soul Man.

Since 2013, Williams has been a replacement performer on the CW revival of the television show Whose Line Is It Anyway?, where he improvises scenes and songs. He also provides the voice for Mufasa in The Lion Guard replacing James Earl Jones, and has provided voices for Star Wars Rebels. In 2017, he voiced Bark Knight and Baboo from the animated Disney Junior series Puppy Dog Pals.

In November 2021, it was announced that Williams would be voicing the character, Beta, in the animated comedy-adventure series, Hailey’s On It!, which is slated to premiere in 2023.

Film
Williams has appeared in films such as Undercover Brother, appearing as Smart Brother (having previously voiced the Undercover Brother character in the original internet animated series), Harold & Kumar Go to White Castle, and Soul Plane. On The Boondocks second season premiere, titled "...Or Die Trying", Riley and Robert Freeman could be seen watching the Soul Plane 2 trailer, where they see Williams and John Witherspoon (the voice of Robert who was featured in the original Soul Plane) voicing fictionalized versions of themselves. He also voiced Sweet in The Trumpet of the Swan and a demon in the horror film Truth or Dare. He appeared in the film The Factory, starring John Cusack (with whom he also appeared in Midnight in the Garden of Good and Evil. In 2011, he narrated the feature-length documentary Ayn Rand and the Prophecy of Atlas Shrugged. He also played Melvin in House Party: Tonight's the Night and Anton Zeck / Bebop in Teenage Mutant Ninja Turtles: Out of the Shadows.

Improvisational comedy

Williams is a regular performer with the Flying Fannoli Brothers, an improv comedy band. He performs in the improvisational shows Cookin' With Gas and The Black Version at The Groundlings Theatre in Los Angeles. Williams also returns to Atlanta to perform with Laughing Matters once or twice a year. Since 2013 he has been a recurring performer on The CW's revival of Whose Line Is It Anyway?.

Video games
Williams provided the voices for the characters of Yancy Westridge in Alpha Protocol, Elanos Haliat in Mass Effect and Horace Warfield in StarCraft II: Wings of Liberty and Heart of the Swarm.

Personal life
Williams is married to Leslie Williams. Together they have a son, Ethan.

Filmography

Film

Television

Video games

Web series

Production credits

References

External links

 
 Ex-Fayetteville Resident Goes Legal by Rodney Ho for The Atlanta Journal-Constitution, January 16, 2007. Retrieved July 23, 2007
 Comic Makes Time for a Pal in Need by Richard L. Eldredge for The Atlanta Journal-Constitution, May 3, 2007. Retrieved July 23, 2007
 Gary Anthony Williams Causes a 'Ruckus' by Janice Rhoshalle Littlejohn for the Associated Press, November 11, 2007. Retrieved on November 11, 2007.

1966 births
Living people
20th-century American male actors
21st-century American male actors
20th-century African-American people
21st-century African-American people
African-American male actors
American male comedians
American male film actors
American male television actors
American male video game actors
American male voice actors
American television directors
American writers
Male actors from Atlanta
People from Fayetteville, Georgia
Television producers from Georgia (U.S. state)